Heleobia is a genus of small freshwater and brackish water snails with a gill and an operculum, aquatic gastropod mollusks in the family Cochliopidae and the superfamily Truncatelloidea.

Heleobia is one of three genera (together with Semisalsa and Heleobops) within the subfamily Semisalsinae. Some authors treated Semisalsa as a subgenus of Heleobia.

Species
Species within the genus Heleobia include:
Heleobia andicola (d’Orbigny, 1835)
Heleobia australis (d’Orbigny)
Heleobia castellanosae (Gaillard, 1974)
Heleobia berryi (Pilsbry, 1924)
Heleobia charruana (d’Orbigny, 1840)
Heleobia conexa (M. C. Gaillard, 1974)
Heleobia contempta (Dautzenberg, 1894)
Heleobia culminea (d’Orbigny, 1840)  - the type species
Heleobia deserticola Collado, 2015 
Heleobia dobrogica Grossu & Negrea, 1989
Heleobia hatcheri  (Pilsbry, 1911)
Heleobia isabelleana (d’Orbigny, 1840)
Heleobia longiscata (Bourguignat, 1856)
Heleobia parchappii (d’Orbigny, 1835)
Heleobia piscium  (d’Orbigny, 1835)
Heleobia robusta da Silva & Veitenheimer-Mendes, 2004
Helobia Dobrica

Species brought into synonymy
 subgenus Heleobia (Semisalsa) Radoman, 1974: synonym of Semisalsa Radoman, 1974Heleobia dalmatica (Radoman, 1974): synonym of Semisalsa dalmatica Radoman, 1974Heleobia stagnorum (Gmelin, 1791): synonym of Semisalsa stagnorum (Gmelin, 1791)

References

 Hershler R. & Thompson F.G. (1992) A review of the aquatic gastropod subfamily Cochliopinae (Prosobranchia: Hydrobiidae).'' Malacological Review suppl. 5: 1-140.

External links 

 Genus taxon summary for Heleobia. AnimalBase.
 
 

Cochliopidae